Dandora is a slum in Nairobi. It is part of the Embakasi division. Surrounding neighbourhoods include other slums such Kariobangi, Baba Dogo, Gitare Marigo and Korogocho. Dandora was established in 1977, with partial financing by the World Bank in order to offer a higher standard of housing.

The location is in part well known for being the site of the main municipal solid waste dump for Nairobi, which has significant negative health effects on its population.
Neighbouring are Kayole, Korogocho, Mathare and Kariobangi.

Dump site 
Nairobi's principle dumping site is situated in Dandora. The Dandora Oxygenation Ponds, a prominent feature on satellite imagery of the area, is Nairobi's main sewage treatment works, and discharges processed water into the Nairobi River. Dandora is divided into 5 phases. Crime thrives here due to high rate of school drop out and the city's dumpsite. The dumpsite is an environmental hazard. The burning of the waste during the night can cause choking. Houses nearing the site are filled with smoke making it hard to breathe.

At the dumping site, many people experience health risks. For example, skin diseases are common for a big part of the people living there. Moreover, there are many resources of toxic waste. Inhabitants could experience health effects of this because the toxic substances that are in for example  e-waste could end up in the air. Due to this, air pollution can emerge. Behind of this, people without access to a job collect waste to sell. Through this, there is a possibility of income.

Besides the health risks that emerge due to waste, more hazards are apparent. As mentioned, crime rates are high and in some parts of the waste dump, police do not keep watch. Another risk can be seen in food insecurity. Because of a lack of proper food, people search for food in the waste. Eating food that is found in the waste could be dangerous for the health of the people living at Dandora. Furthermore, many children who are living at the waste dump have no access to education.

References

1977 establishments in Kenya
Populated places in Kenya
Shanty towns in Kenya
Slums in Kenya
Suburbs of Nairobi
Squatting in Kenya